Achin' and Shakin' is the second studio album released by Broadway actress and Mercury Nashville American Country Music recording artist Laura Bell Bundy. The album which was released on April 13, 2010, is Bundy's first mainstream album; her first album, Longing for a Place Already Gone, was self-released in 2007. Achin' and Shakin''' features the singles "Giddy On Up" and "Drop On By".

Promotion
Bundy appeared on CMT's Top Twenty Countdown to talk about the new album and debut a fan-made version of her "Giddy On Up" video on April 9, 2010. She also performed "Giddy On Up" on the 2010 Academy of Country Music Awards on April 18, 2010. She appeared on Good Morning America on April 21, The Tonight Show with Jay Leno on April 29 and appeared on Chelsea Lately on May 11, 2010.Laura Bell Bundy on Good Morning America

Content
The album is divided into two themes: "Achin'", which comprises tracks 1-6, and "Shakin'", which comprises tracks 7-12. Nathan Chapman produced the "Achin'" tracks; Mike Shimshack produced "Giddy On Up", "I'm No Good for Ya Baby", and "Everybody", while Kyle Kelso produced "Rebound", "Boyfriend?", and "If You Want My Love".

Track listing

Personnel
 Laura Bell Bundy - lead vocals
 Chris Carmichael - strings
 Nathan Chapman - acoustic guitar, electric guitar, background vocals
 Stephanie Chapman - background vocals
 Chad Cromwell - drums
 Dan Dugmore - steel guitar, mandolin
 Aubrey Haynie - fiddle
 Kirk "Jelly Roll" Johnson - harmonica
 Kyle Kelso - bass guitar, acoustic guitar, Hammond B-3 organ, percussion, programming
 Tim Lauer - accordion, Hammond B-3 organ, piano, pump organ, Wurlitzer
 Duke Levine - dobro, baritone guitar, electric guitar, slide guitar
 Rob McNelley - electric guitar
 Marc Muller - banjo, dobro, fiddle, acoustic guitar, electric guitar, mandolin, steel guitar, synthesizer bass
 Steve Nathan - Hammond B-3 organ, Wurlitzer
 Angela Primm - background vocals
 Michael Rhodes - bass guitar
 Mike Shimshack - bass guitar, acoustic guitar, Hammond B-3 organ, percussion, programming
 Ilya Toshinsky - acoustic guitar
 Gayle Mayes-West - background vocals
 Nir Z. - drums

Chart performance
The album debuted at number 5 on the U.S. Billboard'' Top Country Albums chart and #28 on the U.S. Billboard 200, selling nearly 15,000 copies in its first week, becoming the highest debut album sales by a female country artist since Julianne Hough in 2008. As of June 26, 2010, the album has sold 72,181 copies.

End of year charts

References

External links
 Laura Bell Bundy, "Achin' & Shakin'" by Billboard

2010 albums
Laura Bell Bundy albums
Mercury Nashville albums
Albums produced by Nathan Chapman (record producer)